George Robert Merrell Jr. (July 13, 1898 – December 16, 1962) was an American diplomat who served as the United States Ambassador to Ethiopia and United States Ambassador to Afghanistan. During his diplomatic career he served in Haiti, China, India, and Afghanistan.

Early life

George Robert Merrell Jr. was born in St. Louis, Missouri, on July 13, 1898. During World War I he served in the United States Army. He graduated from Soldan High School and graduated from Cornell University in 1921.

On January 18, 1936, Merrell married Nathalie Bishop Choate, but Choate later filed for divorce in 1939. She accused Merrell of cruelty and was given the divorce after an eight minute trial.

Career

In 1921, Merrell became a diplomat for the United States. From March 1924 to October 26, he served as the Chargé d’Affaires ad interim to Haiti. In April 1935, Merrell became the First Secretary of the United States Legation in Peiping, China.

On April 26, 1941, Merrell was appointed to serve as the Consul in Calcutta, India. On September 20, he was promoted to consul general and October 25, he was appointed to simultaneously serve as the Consul General in Kabul, Afghanistan. In 1945, Merrell was appointed by President Franklin D. Roosevelt to serve as the United States Minister to India and was approved by the United States Senate on February 27.

On April 15, 1947, President Harry S. Truman appointed Merrell to replace Felix Cole as the Envoy Extraordinary and Minister Plenipotentiary. Henry F. Grady was appointed to succeed Merrell as the United States Ambassador to India. On May 14, the United States Senate approved his nomination and he presented his credentials on January 1, 1948. On June 28, 1949, he was promoted to Ambassador Extraordinary and Plenipotentiary and served until March 17, 1951.

On April 19, 1951, he was appointed to serve as the United States Ambassador to Afghanistan. He presented his credentials on June 28, 1951, and served until May 3, 1952.

Later life

On December 16, 1962, Merrell died from after suffering a stroke in London, United Kingdom. He was visiting his sister Ruth, who was an assistant to David K. E. Bruce, the United States Ambassador to the United Kingdom.

References

Cornell University alumni
Ambassadors of the United States to Haiti
Ambassadors of the United States to India
Ambassadors of the United States to Ethiopia
Ambassadors of the United States to Afghanistan
American consuls
20th-century American diplomats